Buy Me a Coffee (BMC) is an American crowdfunding company based in San Francisco, California, United States. It provides a service for creators to collect donations from their supporters.

As of April 2021, it has more than 300,000 creators. BMC charges no monthly fees, but charges a transaction fee of 5 percent on any support received by the creator.

History 
The company was founded in 2018 by Jijo Sunny, Joseph Sunny, and Aleesha John.

References

External links 
Official Website

American companies established in 2018
Companies based in San Francisco
Crowdfunding platforms of the United States
Subscription services